Las Tusas is a census-designated place (CDP) in Cibola County, New Mexico, United States. At the 2010 census the CDP was known as Bluewater Acres and had a population of 206.

Geography
Las Tusas is located in northwestern Cibola County, near the southern tip of Bluewater Lake, a reservoir on Bluewater Creek north of Salitre Mesa. New Mexico State Road 612 (Bluewater Road) leads north from the community  to Thoreau and Interstate 40. A Forest Service road leads south from Bluewater Acres through Cibola National Forest  to NM 53 near the Continental Divide.

Demographics

References

Census-designated places in Cibola County, New Mexico
Census-designated places in New Mexico